Shahneh or Shehneh may refer to:
 Shehneh, Fars (شهنه - Shehneh), Iran
 Shahneh, Yazd (شحنه - Shaḩneh), Iran